Dunlap Lake may refer to:

Dunlap Lake (Edwardsville, Illinois)
Lake Dunlap, a reservoir on the Guadalupe River in Guadalupe County, Texas.